The Marque is the tallest residential development in Cambridge, England. The building is nine storeys high  and comprises 92 apartments.
The three floor penthouse is the highest residence in the city and is 2697 square feet. It was priced at £1.3m, sold to a Chinese investor who immediately sold it on to a British buyer.

The building made the shortlist for the 2014 Carbuncle Cup for the ugliest building of the year.

References

External links
 http://www.the-marque.co.uk

Buildings and structures in Cambridge